Maryan Marushchak (born 10 May 1979) is a professional Ukrainian football goalkeeper who plays for FC Lviv in the Ukrainian Premier League.

External links
Profile on Official FC Lviv Website
Profile on EUFO
Profile on Football Squads
Profile at FFU Site 

1979 births
Living people
Ukrainian footballers
FC Lviv (1992) players
FC Lviv players
FC Hoverla Uzhhorod players
FC Obolon-Brovar Kyiv players
FC Sevastopol players
Association football goalkeepers